2014 Blaublitz Akita season. The annual club slogan was "挑". The headquarters and practice facilities were transferred from Nikaho to Akita.

Squad
As of 2014.

J3 League

Standings

Emperor's Cup

Other games

Gallery

References

External links
 J.League official site

Blaublitz Akita
Blaublitz Akita seasons